Yamuna Devi (also ; 19th May 1942–20th December 2011), born Joan Agnes Campanella in Butte, Montana was an American cookbook author, best known for her 1987 cookbook, The Art of Indian Vegetarian Cooking.

History
Devi was a senior member of the International Society for Krishna Consciousness (ISKCON).. She was part of the early 1960s Beat Generation in North Beach, San Francisco before meeting A. C. Bhaktivedanta Swami Prabhupada in New York City in 1966; becoming an initiated disciple in 1967.

In late 1966, at Srila Prabhupada's request, together with her sister Janaki and Janaki's husband Mukunda she travelled to San Francisco  to help establish an ISKCON temple. This temple, at 518 Frederick Street in Haight-Ashbury, became the first ISKCON temple on the West Coast of the United States.

In 1968, together with five other Hare Krishna followers, Yamuna flew to London to establish ISKCON in the United Kingdom. There, she helped introduce Beatles guitarist George Harrison to Gaudiya Vaishnava philosophy and practice. Yamuna sang co-lead vocals on the 1969 Apple Records "Hare Krishna Mantra" single, which reached number 12 in the UK Chart. She also sang lead vocals on the 1970 Apple Records "Govinda" single, which reached number 23 in the UK Chart

From 1970 to 1974 she lived and travelled in India with Srila Prabhupada as part of the World Sankirtan Party

Yamuna was noted by her peers for her great humility and has been cited as an inspiration by figures such as Jahnavi Harrison

Cookbooks
In 1988 she won two James Beard Awards, including Cookbook of the Year, for her 1987 cookbook, The Art of Indian Vegetarian Cooking. This was followed by a further award in 1993 for her book Yamuna's Table.

References

External links
Yamuna Devi Passes Away
Devotees Say Their Goodbyes to Yamuna Devi at Alachua Memorial

1942 births
2011 deaths
People from Butte, Montana
American Hare Krishnas
Beat Generation people
James Beard Foundation Award winners
Singers from London
Vegetarian cookbook writers
Vegetarian cookbooks